Gjelsvik is a surname. Notable people with the surname include:

Agvald Gjelsvik (1907–1976), Norwegian educator and politician
Kristin Gjelsvik (born 1986), Norwegian blogger and YouTuber
Nikolaus Gjelsvik (1866–1938), Norwegian jurist and law professor
Olav Gjelsvik (born 1956), Norwegian philosopher
Sigbjørn Gjelsvik (born 1974), Norwegian politician